East Gore is a small community in the Canadian province of Nova Scotia, located in  The Municipality of the District of East Hants in Hants County.

History (from The Hants Journal: July 1, 1981)
"Gore was named after Sir Charles Stephen Gore, who was in Canada as deputy quartermaster general during the rebellion of 1837. Settlement here was begun by disbanded soldiers of the 84th regiment about 1785."

It was settled in 1759 as part of the Douglas Township by the 84th regiment, many of whom came from Pennsylvania, USA.

Courthouse
"The old courthouse standing on Judgement Hill for 90 years or more, was destroyed by fire July 22, 1956." (from The Hants Journal: July 1, 1981)

Blueberry and dairy farming are the main industries.

References
East Gore on Destination Nova Scotia

Communities in Hants County, Nova Scotia
General Service Areas in Nova Scotia